The Chesley Award for Best Cover Illustration - Hardcover has been presented every year since 1985 by the Association of Science Fiction and Fantasy Artists to recognize achievement in the illustration of hardcover science fiction & fantasy. Each year the award recognizes works that were eligible for the award during the preceding year.

Winners and nominees

References

External links
 The Chesley Award section of the ASFA website
 Locus Index to SF Awards: 2006 Chesley awards

Science fiction awards
Cover Illustration Hardcover